Petty Harbour–Maddox Cove is a town of approximately 960 people located on the eastern shore of the Avalon Peninsula in the province of Newfoundland and Labrador, Canada. It is nestled deep in the heart of Motion Bay, just south (approximately 15 minutes away) of St. John's. The present town is approximately 200 years old, though the site has been continuously occupied since at least 1598. During King William's War, the village was raided by French forces in the Avalon Peninsula Campaign.

Petty Harbour–Maddox Cove is the site of the Petty Harbour Generating Station, the first hydroelectric generating station in Newfoundland and Labrador.

Etymology
The name Petty Harbour is the anglicized form of the French name  meaning 'small harbour'. It was first settled by French colonists.

Demographics 

Notable people
Alan Doyle, lead singer of the band Great Big Sea
Bren Smith, founder of GreenWave

See also
 List of cities and towns in Newfoundland and Labrador
 Petty Harbour Generating Station
 Great Big Sea
 SS Regulus

References

External links

 Great Big Sea Website
 Petty Harbour Bait Skiff folk song
 Chafe's Landing Restaurant
 ShoreLark by the Sea Vacation Rentals
Petty Harbour-Maddox Cove - Encyclopedia of Newfoundland and Labrador, vol. 4, p. 275-277.

Populated coastal places in Canada
Towns in Newfoundland and Labrador
Fishing communities in Canada